The yellowspotted catshark (Scyliorhinus capensis) is a rare catshark of the family Scyliorhinidae. The reproduction of this catshark is oviparous.

Description
The yellowspotted catshark is a long slender fish with rough skin. The upperparts are light grey, copiously spotted with small golden-yellow spots. There are eight or nine dark patches on the back which bridge the spine. The underside is cream-coloured. Small flaps cover the nostrils but do not extend as far as the mouth and there are no nasoral grooves. There are two triangular dorsal fins, the front one considerably larger than the rear one.

Distribution and habitat
Its range extends from Lüderitz in Namibia to central Natal. Although fairly common off the coast of South Africa it occurs less frequently and in deeper waters in the more tropical parts of its range in Namibia and Natal. Although seen over sandy bottoms, it also frequents rocky reefs.

Biology
The yellowspotted catshark feeds on small fish, crustaceans and squid. This shark is more common on rocky reefs than on sandy seabeds.

Status
The IUCN, in its Red List of Threatened Species lists the yellowspotted catshark as being "Near Threatened". In the offshore waters where it lives there is a large hake fishery and the yellowspotted catshark is caught and discarded as bycatch during trawling. The rate of reproduction is probably failing to keep up with the depletion of the adult population by this means thus threatening the species' future.

References

yellowspotted catshark
Fish of South Africa
Marine fauna of Southern Africa
yellowspotted catshark